RWJBarnabas Health is a network of independent healthcare providers in New Jersey, based out of West Orange. Members include academic centers, acute care facilities, and research hospitals. The goals of the network include collaboration on educational and research programs.

RWJBarnabas Health was created through the 2015 merger of the Robert Wood Johnson Health System and the Saint Barnabas Health Care System.

As of 2022, RWJBarnabas employs approximately 37,000 employees, 9,000 physicians, and 1,000 resident and interns. In January 2023, Mark Manigan replaced Barry Ostrowsky as president & CEO of the health system.

History 
In 2015, Saint Barnabas Health Care System and Robert Wood Johnson Health System signed an agreement which outlines the merger between these two health systems. Once complete, the transaction created New Jersey's largest health care system and one of the largest in the nation. The New Jersey Attorney General needed to review the deal before it was official, with the expectation that the merger would be completed in 2016. On March 30, 2016, the two health systems officially merged and formed RWJBarnabas Health.

Trinitas Regional Acquisition 
In October 2019, the leaders of RWJBarnabas Health signed a letter of intent to acquire the Trinitas Regional Medical Center in Elizabeth, New Jersey. The preliminary letter of intent is a nonbinding agreement that will lay out a basic structure for the proposed acquisition of the hospital and the nearby long-term care center. Trinitas would still retain its core Catholic ideologies upon the acquisition and continue to maintain its affiliation with the Sisters of Charity of Saint Elizabeth.

On November 12, 2020, it was announced that the health systems had signed a definitive agreement that the two systems would merge. Trinitas's board would still oversee day-to-day operations.

On January 6, 2022, Trinitas officially became part of the RWJBarnabas Health system.

Saint Peters Acquisition 
In late 2019, it was announced that the leaders of RWJBarnabas Health and the leaders of Saint Peter's Healthcare System signed a letter of intent to explore a merger. The preliminary plan calls for significant investments in Saint Peter's by RWJBarnabas Health to help expand the outpatient services currently provided by Saint Peter's. Saint Peter's would remain a Catholic hospital and continue its sponsorship by the Roman Catholic Diocese of Metuchen. According to administrations from both hospitals, the two parties have been in discussions for a while and believe they could both benefit from the merger. The merger would also strengthen education services provided at the two already Rutgers affiliated hospitals.

On September 10, 2020, it was announced that the health systems had signed a definitive agreement that the two systems would merge. The merger would create the largest academic medical center in the state. After the signing of the agreement, the potential partnership began a period of review by state and federal regulatory agencies. The Federal Trade Commission announced on June 2, 2022, that they are suing to block the merger. On June 14, 2022, it was announced that the agreement was terminated.

Rutgers Partnership 
In August 2018, a partnership was announced with Rutgers University, making the RWJBarnabas the largest academic health system in New Jersey. The announcement was made public by Jonathan Holloway, President of Rutgers, and Barry Ostrowsky, then-President & CEO of the health system.

In February 2021, it was further announced that the two entities would begin an Integrated Practice Agreement (IPA) between Rutgers' Robert Wood Johnson Medical School and the RWJBarnabas group practices.

See also 

 Hackensack Meridian Health
 Atlantic Health System
 The Bristol-Myers Squibb Children's Hospital

References

External links 
 Official RWJBarnabas Health site

Hospital networks in the United States
Medical and health organizations based in New Jersey
Hospitals established in 2015
2015 establishments in New Jersey
West Orange, New Jersey
Health care companies based in New Jersey